Newberry Township may refer to the following townships in the United States:

 Newberry Township, Miami County, Ohio
 Newberry Township, York County, Pennsylvania